The United States Campaign for Burma (USCB) is a U.S.-based membership organization that evolved out of the Free Burma Coalition founded by Maung Zarni. Founders were Jack Healey, who provided fiscal sponsorship to the organization from founding until it finally obtained its own nonprofit status in 2008, Jeremy Woodrum, and Dan Beeton. It is dedicated to empowering grassroots activists around the world to bring about an end to the military dictatorship in Burma. Through public education, leadership development initiatives, conferences, and advocacy campaigns at local, national and international levels, USCB works to empower Americans and Burmese dissidents-in-exile to promote freedom, democracy, and human rights in Burma and raise awareness about the egregious human rights violations committed by Burma's military regime.

Mission 
The mission of USCB is to build a broad-based coalition of grassroots and institutional support for freedom in Burma. Today, USCB is active on social media and through its newsletter but does not maintain a physical location or any paid staff.

USCB's objectives included:

 To strengthen the position of 1991 Nobel Peace Prize recipient Aung San Suu Kyi and the democratically elected National League for Democracy, by cutting the political and economic lifelines of the ruling military junta;
 To organize and advocate for international intervention in Burma; and
 To inform grassroots citizens, international media and policymakers about Burma’s political, social and economic crisis.

Structure 
U.S. Campaign for Burma is a 501(c)3, tax-exempt, organization. The board of directors are internally appointed and have no responsibilities to the membership at large.

Anyone may participate in USCB and receive updates, emails, and participate in campaigns by signing up through the web page.

Asian-American culture in Washington, D.C.
Burmese American
Burmese democracy movements
Non-profit organizations based in Washington, D.C.